Phyllonorycter kamijoi is a moth of the family Gracillariidae. It is known from the islands of Honshū and Kyūshū in Japan and from Korea.

The wingspan is 5.5-6.5 mm.

The larvae feed on Castanea crenata and Quercus acutissima. They mine the leaves of their host plant. The mine has the form of a ptychonomous leaf mine on the lower surface of the leaves.

References

kamijoi
Moths of Asia
Moths described in 1963